Luke Miles (born 30 October 1986) is an Australian rules footballer who has played for the St Kilda Football Club in the Australian Football League (AFL) and Swan Districts Football Club in the Western Australian Football League (WAFL).

After attending Guildford Grammar School in Perth, Western Australia, Miles began his career with WAFL club Swan Districts, playing in the Swan Districts reserves premiership team in 2005 and winning the Swan Districts League best and fairest award in 2006. He was drafted by St Kilda with the 24th selection of the 2008 Rookie Draft and after two seasons with St Kilda's Victorian Football League (VFL) affiliate Casey Scorpions, Miles was elevated to St Kilda's senior list with the 93rd selection in the 2009 AFL Draft.

Miles made his senior AFL debut in round 21 of the 2010 AFL season. He played again the next week, but was dropped from the senior team for the finals series. After winning the 2010 AFL Grand Final sprint, Miles was delisted by St Kilda on 10 October 2010.

Miles returned to Swan Districts for the 2011 WAFL season.

References

External links 

St Kilda Football Club players
Swan Districts Football Club players
Casey Demons players
Australian rules footballers from Western Australia
1986 births
Living people
People educated at Guildford Grammar School